Cardiac psychology is a specialization of health psychology that focuses on the primary and secondary prevention of heart disease by incorporating strategies to address the emotional and behavioral barriers to lifestyle changes (e.g. smoking cessation), and that seeks to enhance recovery in cardiac patients by means of providing patients tools (e.g. stress management and psychotherapy) to cope with life and physical changes associated with their disease. Cardiac psychologists can help cardiac patients across the lifespan: prevention, pre-surgery, post-surgery, and rehabilitation of cardiac disease with a particular emphasis on achieving optimal quality of life outcomes.
Cardiac psychology  includes both research and clinical practice aspects.

History
The earliest published mention of cardiac psychology in Western medicine literature was in 1628 when William Harvey wrote that "a mental disturbance provoking pain, excessive joy, hope or anxiety extends to the heart, where it affects temper."
Research labs have been founded at Tilburg University, Tilburg Netherlands led by Dr. Susanne Pedersen, and at East Carolina University, Greenville, North Carolina led by Dr. Samuel Sears, that focus on psychological aspects of cardiac disease. Cardiac psychology as a term was first used by Robert Allan, PhD, and Stephen Schiedt, MD, as a title of their 1996 book, Heart and Mind: The Practice of Cardiac Psychology and launched increased attention to the clinical practice of cardiac psychology. More recently, additional texts, such as Psychotherapy with Cardiac Patients, (2008) by Ellen Dornelas, have attempted to update the literature related to clinical techniques used in the care of cardiac patients. Significant research reviews have also been published spanning psychological factors in cardiac care, implantable electronic medical devices (pacemaker, implantable cardioverter-defibrillator, etc.) and congestive heart failure.

Notes

References
 Allan, R., & Scheidt, S.S. (1996). Heart and mind: The practice of cardiac psychology. Washington, D.C.: American Psychological Association.
 Dimsdale, D.E. (2008). Psychological stress and cardiovascular disease. Journal of the American College of Cardiology, 51, 1237–46.
 Dornelas, E. (2008). Psychotherapy with cardiac patients. (Washington, D.C.: American Psychological Association).
 Pedersen, S.S.; van den Broek, K.C.; van den Berg, M.; Theuns, D. (2010). Shock as a determinant of poor patient-centered outcomes in implantable cardioverter defibrillator patients: Is there more to it than meets the eye? Pacing Clin Electrophysiol (In press).
 Molinari, E.; Compare, A.; Parati, G. (2006). Clinical Psychology and Heart Disease. Springer, NY
 Rozanski, A.; Blumenthal, J.; Davidson, K.; Saab, P.; & Kubzansky, L. (2005). The epidemiology, pathophysiology, and management of psychosocial risk factors in cardiac practice. Journal of the American College of Cardiology, 45, 637–51.
 Rutledge, T.; Reis, V.A.; Linke, S.E.; Greenberg, B.H. & Mills, P.J. (2006). Depression in congestive heart failure: A meta-analytic review of prevalence, intervention effects, and associations with clinical outcomes. Journal of the American College of Cardiology, 48, 1527–37.
 Sears, S.; Matchett, M.; Conti, J. Effective management of ICD patient psychosocial issues and patient critical events. J Cardiovasc Electrophysiol 2009; 20(11): 1297–304.

Further reading
 Paul Pearsall, The Heart's Code: Tapping the Wisdom and Power of Our Heart Energy, Broadway Books,  1999, 

Cardiology
Health psychology